Kulir 100° is a 2009 Tamil-language film written, directed, and produced by Anita Udeep in her Tamil debut. The film stars Sanjeev and Riya Bamniyal while Thalaivasal Vijay, Adithya Menon,  Karthik Sabesh, and Rohit Rathod play supporting roles. The music was composed by first-timer Bobo Shashi with editing by B. Lenin and cinematography by L. K. Vijay. The film released on 5 June 2009.it is a unofficial copy of swedish movie called evil

Plot 
Surya is the son of a local dada and studies at the Chengalpet Matriculation School. His mother, who is separated from her husband, wants him to grow up as a model citizen. Surya is violent like his father, and gets expelled for beating up a teacher. Surya, who is attached to his mother, promises that he will not take the path to violence again, and joins the Lake View School in Ooty. Surya is looked down by his snooty seniors led by school bully Rohit and his gang. The only people who stand with him are Babloo and the principal Yeshwanth Raj's daughter Tanya, who has a soft corner for him. Under extreme provocation, Surya keeps his cool as he tries to live up to his mother's expectations. However, he relapses after Babloo is murdered and goes on a revenge spree.

Cast 
Sanjeev as Surya
Riya Bamniyal as Tanya
Thalaivasal Vijay as Yeshwanth Raj
Adithya Menon as Surya's father
Karthik Sabesh as Babloo
Rohit Rathod as Rohit

Production 
Kulir 100 is the first Tamil film directed by Anita Udeep. According to her, the title "indicates it's both cold and hot which means that opposites attract, the basic framework of the film." Shooting for the film took place in Switzerland, Kulu, Manali, Yercaud and Ooty.

Reception 
Behindwoods said, "The title could be reminiscent of all things pleasant in this inexorably hot weather, but watching debutant director Anita Udeep's Kulir doesn't have the same effect. Anita, after probably having set out to deliver a message-movie, has lagged behind soon enough and ended up doing just the opposite" and concluded "Experience the cold!", while rating the film 0.5 out of 5 stars. Sify said, "The film lacks the magic one associate with boarding school brat pack movie. Let us hope Anita Udeep, learns from her mistakes and finds a better script in her next outing." Pavithra Srinivasan of Rediff said, "Kulir 100 Degrees tries very hard to simulate the lives of youngsters, but it seems to flit to the next scene before any scenario can be fully explored, leaving you with a sense of dissatisfaction. In the end, the result is rather half-baked. The cool visuals and neat songs are the only compensation." and rated the film 2 out of 5 stars.

Soundtrack 

The film's score and soundtrack were composed by Bobo Shashi. The soundtrack album has seven tracks, with lyrics written by Pa. Vijay, V. Ilango, the girl band Purple Patch, Boomerang X and the duo Thug Laws, Abhishek, and Shivam. The album was released at Sathyam Cinemas on 13 November 2008 by the director Gautham Vasudev Menon.

The soundtrack won critical acclaim, with one critic noting "it’s a definite must-try for its target group".

References

External links 
 
 Listen to Songs

2009 films
Films shot in Ooty
2000s Tamil-language films
Indian films about revenge
Films set in schools
2009 directorial debut films